The little tube-nosed bat (Murina aurata) is a species of bat.  An adult little tube-nosed bat has a body length of 4.0-4.6 cm, a tail length of 2.8-3.6 cm, and a wing length of 3.0-3.3 cm.  The species is found across South and East Asia, from the Indian subcontinent to the Korean Peninsula.

References

External links
Zipcode Zoo

Mammals of India
Murininae
Bats of Asia
Bats of South Asia
Bats of Southeast Asia
Mammals of China
Mammals of Korea
Mammals of Vietnam
Mammals described in 1872
Taxa named by Alphonse Milne-Edwards